Victor Hamilton may refer to:

 Victor Norris Hamilton (born 1919), American cryptologist
 Victor P. Hamilton (born 1941), Canadian / American theologian